The 120th Fighter Aviation Regiment was a fighter aircraft regiment of the Soviet Air Forces, formed twice in 1940 and 1969.

First Formation 
Initially the regiment was formed from October 24, 1940 in the Moscow Military District in the city of Klin equipped with Polikarpov I-153 aircraft. Pilots were drawn from 1940 graduates of the Batayskaya, Kamenskaya, Kachinskaya, Chkalovskaya, Chuguevskoy and Odessa military aviation schools. The regiment completed its formation and attained combat readiness as part of the Moscow Air Defence District on December 31, 1940. It was allocated the Field mail number 35470. It formed part of the 24th Fighter Aviation Division.

From June 22, 1941 the regiment was at war, as part of the Great Patriotic War, defending against the German Operation Barbarossa. On 7 March 1942, in recognition of the regiment's "exemplary performance of combat missions and the courage and heroism shown," it was redesignated the 12th Guards Fighter Aviation Regiment PVO. It was thus part of the "Active Army" for 185 days from June 22, 1941 to March 7, 1942.

Regiment commanders 1940 - 1942 
 lieutenant colonel Devotchenko, Ivan Georgievich, from January 1, 1941 to July 2, 1941
 Major Pisanko Alexander Stepanovich, from July 2, 1941 to March 6, 1942
 Major, Lieutenant Colonel Marenkov Konstantin Vasilyevich, from March 6, 1942 to December 31, 1945

References 

  (944 pages) (circulation 1500). 

Fighter aviation regiments of the Soviet Union in World War II
Military units and formations established in 1940